The Shakhtar Donetsk 2012–13 season is Shakhtar's twenty second Ukrainian Premier League season, and they are the current defending champions.

Squad

Out on loan

Transfers

In

Out

Loans out

Friendlies

Copa del Sol

Competitions

Overall

Supercup

Premier League

Results summary

Results by round

Matches

League table

Ukrainian Cup

UEFA Champions League

Group stage

Head-to-head record

Knockout phase

Squad statistics

Appearances and goals

|-
|colspan="14"|Players away from the club on loan:

|-
|colspan="14"|Players who appeared for Shakhtar who left the club during the season:

|}

Goalscorers

Clean sheets

Disciplinary record

References

External links 
 

Shakhtar Donetsk season
FC Shakhtar Donetsk seasons
Shakhtar Donetsk
Ukrainian football championship-winning seasons